Ellen Fuson Port (born September 21, 1961) is an amateur golfer and former golf coach. At amateur events, Port has won over twenty combined amateur championships held by the Missouri Golf Association and Metropolitan Amateur Golf Association from 1992 to 2021. As a United States Golf Association player, Port has won the U.S. Women's Mid-Amateur four times and the United States Senior Women's Amateur Golf Championship three times. With her seven wins, Port is tied for fifth for most career wins by an USGA golfer. At team events, Port was part of the American Curtis Cup team that won in 1994, lost in 1996 and captained the winning team in 2014.

As a coach at John Burroughs School, Port began to teach field hockey and golf in the early 1990s. With the golf teams at John Burroughs, Port was the coach of two teams that won championships held by the Missouri State High School Activities Association. After leaving John Burroughs in 2015, Port continued to teach golf with the women's team at Washington University in St. Louis until 2018. With Washington, Port and her team was tied for tenth at the 2018 NCAA Division III Women's Golf Championships. Port was inducted into the Missouri Sports Hall of Fame in 2012.

Early life and education
Port was born in North Kansas City, Missouri on September 21, 1961. During her childhood, Port participated in basketball, swimming and tennis. While attending North Kansas City High School, Port was the 1979 girls recipient for best competitor in sports for the high school. For her post-secondary education, Port chose tennis over basketball while attending the University of Missouri. In 1983, Port received a Bachelor of Education from Missouri. After her studies, Port left North Kansas City to live in St. Louis.

Career

Amateur events
Port began playing golf in 1986 when she started working for John Burroughs School. As a member of the Missouri Golf Association, Port won the Amateur Championship nine times between 1992 to 2014. During this time period, Port won the event back to back from 2000 to 2003. She also was second at the Amateur Championship five times from 1996 to 2013. At the Senior Amateur Championship, Port won the event in 2020 and 2021.

For Metropolitan Amateur Golf Association events, Port won the Metropolitan Women’s Amateur Championship sixteen times from 1993 to 2018. During this championship, Port was the back-to-back winner from 2000 to 2006. At the Women's Western Amateur, Port reached the quarterfinals during the 1992 and 2001 events. As a Women’s Trans National Golf Association player, Port won their Amateur Championship in 1994. Her win at the 2021 Metropolitan Senior Amateur made Port the first female golfer to ever win the championship event for male golfers. The following year, Port was the senior winner during the 2022 Women's Amateur Championship held by the Amateur Golf Alliance.

At the U.S. Women's Amateur, Port did not qualify in two prior years before reaching the quarterfinals in 1992. During the 1996 edition, Port reached the final 16 of the match play before she was defeated by Kim O'Connor. In the 2003 edition, Port reached the first round of match play. Port was 53 years old when she was cut from the 2015 U.S. Women's Amateur and was older than all of the other golfers to play at that year's event. At the age of 56, Port was the oldest ever U.S. Women's Amateur golfer in the match play round during the 2018 event. With a 33rd finish in 2018, Port later finished the 2020 U.S Women's Amateur in 105th.

At United States Golf Association events, Port won the U.S. Women's Mid-Amateur in 1995, 1996, 2000 and 2011. She also was the runner-up at this event in 2002. Competing at the United States Senior Women's Amateur Golf Championship, Port won the 2012, 2013 and 2016 editions while also finishing in second in 2021. With her seven championship wins, Port is second for most USGA wins won by a female golfer and tied for fifth for most wins by an USGA golfer. In team events, Port was on the American Curtis Cup team that won in 1994 and lost in 1996. Port was also captain of the American team that won the Curtis Cup in 2014. At the 2021 U.S. Women's Amateur Four-Ball, Port and Lara Tennant did not qualify for the playoff round.

Open events
For the U.S. Women's Open, Port received an alternate spot at the 1992 U.S. Women's Open before she withdrew from the event. As a first-time U.S. Women's Open player, Port was cut during the 1993 U.S. Women's Open. Port was also cut at the 1994 U.S. Women's Open and 1996 U.S. Women's Open. During these years, Port played at several events in the 1994 LPGA Tour season.

Competing at the U.S. Senior Women's Open, Port first appeared at the 2018 U.S. Senior Women's Open and finished in 33rd place. At additional Senior Women's Open editions, Port was 40th in 2019 and 20th in 2021. During the 2021 edition of the Senior Women's Open, Port held the amateur records for the least score during an individual round of golf and after 72 holes.

Coaching career
While at John Burroughs, Port taught physical education and was a coach for multiple sport teams at the school. For individual sports, Port was a field hockey coach in early 1990s. During the late 1990s, Port continued to teach field hockey while also teaching golf. For her golf experience, Port became a golf coach in 1993 for boys before expanding in 2011 to girls. At championships held by the Missouri State High School Activities Association, Port won the Class 1A-2A event with the boys team in 1996. With the girls team, Port won the 2013 Class 1 event.

In 2015, Port left John Burroughs to coach the women's golf team at the Washington University in St. Louis. With Washington, Port was named the best Division III coach of the Central Region for the 2016-2017 season by the Women's Golf Coaches Association. At the 2018 NCAA Division III Women's Golf Championships, Port and her team finished in a tie for tenth place with DePauw University. That year, Port left the Washington golf team.

Honors and personal life
Port received the Bernice Edlund Award from the Missouri Golf Association in 2011. In 2012, Port was inducted into the St Louis Sports Hall of Fame and Missouri Sports Hall of Fame. She was additionally inducted into a hall of fame by Missouri Golf Association in 2017. Port was named Women’s Player of the Year multiple times by the Metropolitan Amateur Golf Association, with her latest being given in 2021. She is married and has two children.

References

1961 births
Amateur golfers
American field hockey coaches
Washington University Bears coaches
Golfers from Missouri
Living people
Missouri Tigers women's tennis players